UJA Maccabi Paris Métropole is a French association football club based in Alfortville, a suburb of Paris. The current club was formed in 2012 through a merger of UJA Alfortville (formed in 1926) and SC Maccabi du Paris (formed in 1948).

The club currently play in the Division d'Honneur Paris Île-de-France, effectively the sixth level of French football. It plays its home matches at the Parc Départemental des Sports in the nearby commune of Choisy-le-Roi.

The club has played one season in the Championnat National, having been awarded promotion in the 2009–10 season.

History

SC Maccabi de Paris

Maccabi Paris was a club established in 1948 as a social-sport club for the Jewish community in Paris, it acted in modern times as a simple sport club for a wider French community.

UJA Alfortville 
UJA Alfortville was formed in 1926 under the name Union de la Jeunesse Arménienne d'Alfortville (known simply as Alfortville).

Over the course of a decade, Alfortville has quickly ascended up the French football league system. In 1998, the club was promoted from Promotion d'Honneur. In the following season, Alfortville earned promotion to the Division d'Honneur Régionale and proceeded to advance to the Division Supérieure Régionale two seasons later in 2000. The club remained in the seventh division for six years before achieving promotion to the Division d'Honneur of the Île-de-France region. After one season, Alfortville ascended to the 5th level of the system, CFA 2. The club won its group in the first season, thus earning promotion to the Championnat de France amateur for the 2008–09 season.

After two seasons in the CFA, Alfortville were administratively promoted to the Championnat National due to the demotion through financial issues of RC Strasbourg Alsace. The club was relegated at the end of the season.

UJA Maccabi Paris Métropole 
In June 2012, UJA Alfortville completed the merger with Maccabi Paris, a club from the Division Supérieure Régional. The new club was relegated to the CFA 2 in its first season, and has maintained that level since.

Players

Current squad 
Updated 12 December 2010.

Former players 
For a list of former UJA Alfortville players, see :Category:UJA Maccabi Paris Métropole players.

Honours 
 Championnat de France Amateur 2: 2008
 Division d'Honneur (Île-de-France): 2007
 Division Supérieure Régional (Île-de-France): 2006

References

External links 
 Maccabi Paris - a multinational team (in French)
 New Voices(in English)
  Official Site

Association football clubs established in 1926
1926 establishments in France
Association football clubs established in 1948
Paris
Jewish football clubs
Jews and Judaism in Paris
1948 establishments in France
2012 establishments in France
Association football clubs established in 2012
Maccabi Paris